James Burnes may refer to:

 James N. Burnes (1827–1889), U.S. representative from Missouri
 James Burnes (Medal of Honor) (1870–?), American Medal of Honor recipient
 James Burnes (surgeon) (1801–1862), Scottish medical man in India

See also
James Burns (disambiguation)
James Byrnes (disambiguation)